Kitchings is a surname. Notable people with the surname include:

 Desmond Kitchings (born 1978), American football coach
 Grant Kitchings (1938–2005), American singer
 Irene Kitchings (c. 1908–1975), American jazz pianist

See also
 Kitching, surname